Summon In Thunder is Himsa's fourth and last full-length album. It was released September 18, 2007 through Century Media Records. Music videos were made for the songs "Unleash Carnage" and "Big Timber".

Track listing 
"Reinventing the Noose" – 5:17
"Haunter" – 4:17
"Big Timber" – 4:00
"Given in to the Taking" – 4:02
"Skinwalkers" – 6:41
"Curseworship" – 4:03
"Hooks as Hands" – 4:16
"Ruin Them" – 3:33
"Den of Infamy" – 4:15
"Unleash Carnage" – 2:02
"Summon in Thunder" – 3:13

2007 albums
Himsa albums